Garibaldi School is the former name of Garibaldi College in Nottinghamshire

Garibaldi School may also refer to:
 Garibaldi Secondary School is a grade 8-12 school in Maple Ridge, British Columbia, Canada.
 Garibaldi School in Garibaldi, Oregon